Josiah Aullaqsruaq Patkotak (born March 22, 1994) (last name pronounced Patkutaq in Iñupiaq) is an Iñupiaq politician from Alaska. He has represented District 40 as a Member of the Alaska House of Representatives since 2021. Patkotak defeated another Iñupiaq candidate, Elizabeth Niiqsik Ferguson (D), for the seat by a margin of 200 votes following the retirement of John Lincoln. Patkotak is registered as an Independent. He also played the lead role in Andrew Okpeaha MacLean's On the Ice (2011).

References

External links 
 Josiah Patkotak at Ballotpedia

1994 births
21st-century American politicians
Alaska Independents
Inupiat people
Living people
Members of the Alaska House of Representatives
Native American male actors
Native American state legislators in Alaska
Speakers of the Alaska House of Representatives